Sunthorn Kongsompong (1 August 1931 – 2 August 1999) was the de facto head of government of Thailand from 1991 to 1992, after a military coup d'etat led by Sunthorn and General Suchinda Kraprayoon deposed the government of Prime Minister Chatichai Choonhavan on February 23, 1991.  The generals accused Chatichai of corruption, and established the National Peacekeeping Council (NPKC) as an interim administration, with Sunthorn as chairman.  

Anand Panyarachun was appointed Prime Minister in March, 1991, but the administration of the country was also executed by the NPKC. 

Sunthorn left the political office following the May 1992 constitution promulgation, which prohibited members of the military from executing the office of the Prime Minister.

His son is Apirat Kongsompong, who from 2018 to 2020 was Commander in Chief of the Royal Thai Army.

Honour
received the following royal decorations in the Honours System of Thailand:
 1987 -  Knight Grand Cordon of the Most Exalted Order of the White Elephant 
 1988 -  Knight Grand Cordon of the Most Noble Order of the Crown of Thailand 
 1992 -  Knight Grand Commander of the Most Illustrious Order of Chula Chom Klao 
 1990 -  Companion of the Order of Rama 
 1955 -  Victory Medal - Korean War 
 1973 -  Victory Medal - Vietnam War with flames 
 1988 -  Freemen Safeguarding Medal (First Class)
 1989 -  Border Service Medal
 1964 -  Chakra Mala Medal 
 1989 -  First Class of Boy Scout Citation Medal of Vajira 
 1991 -  King Bhumibol Adulyadej Royal Cypher Medal 1st class

Foreign honour

 :
 1970 -  Vietnamese Cross of Gallantry
   Armed Forces Honor Medal First class
  Vietnam Campaign Medal

 :
 1970 -  Bronze Star Medal With V
 1970 -  Commendation Medal With V and Oak

 :
 1989 -  Commander of the Order of Loyalty to the Crown of Malaysia (P.S.M.)
 1991 -  The Most Gallant Order of Military Service (P.G.A.T.)

  :
 1990 -  Tongil Medal of the Order of National Security Merit
  Republic of Korea Presidential Unit Citation

 :
  United Nations Korea Medal
  United Nations Medal

  :
  Distinguished Service Order (Military)

References

2Bangkok.com article about the coup d'etat
Asiaweek article about estate scandal
http://www.becnews.com/backissue/f_famous/suntorn-k.html (in Thai)
http://www.politicalfriendster.com/showPerson.php?id=3803&name=General-Sunthorn-Kongsompong

Sunthorn Kongsompong
1931 births
1999 deaths
Sunthorn Kongsompong
Sunthorn Kongsompong
Honorary Commanders of the Order of Loyalty to the Crown of Malaysia
Sunthorn Kongsompong
Helicopter pilots
Sunthorn Kongsompong
Sunthorn Kongsompong